Johannes Bøe (January 17, 1891 – February 1, 1971) was a Norwegian archaeologist.

Biography
Johannes Bøe was born in Ringsaker in Hedmark, Norway. He was the son of John O. Bøe (1851–1910) and Marie Nilsdatter Bjerke (1859–1953). His father was a farmer at the Ottersrud farm. 

He studied at the University of Kristiania (now University of Oslo).
In 1921, Bøe received his candidatus philologiæ degree with the thesis Norske guldfund fra folkevandringstiden (Norwegian Gold Finds from the Migration Period). In 1931 he received his doctorate with the dissertation Jernalderens keramikk i Norge (Iron Age Ceramics in Norway). In 1921 he was appointed a researcher at the University Museum of Bergen, and he was later a research professor at the same institution. In 1946, he became a faculty dean at the University of Bergen.

Bøe was distinguished by his exceptionally rich scholarly production, ranging from the early Stone Age to the Iron Age. His best-known work, alongside his doctoral dissertation, is Le Finmarkien: Les origines de la civilisation dans l'extreme-nord de l'Europe (Finnmark: The Origins of Civilization in the Far North of Europe), which he coauthored with Anders Nummedal and in which they established the Komsa culture as having its own status in the Norwegian Stone Age.

Personal life
Bøe married Dagny Godager (1896–1982) in 1920 and was the father of the art historian Alf Bøe (1927–2010).

Awards and recognitions
 Fridtjof Nansen Prize for Outstanding Research, 1932, for his work on Iron Age pottery in Norway
Bøe was appointed a knight of the Order of St. Olav in 1947, and a commander in 1961.

References

1891 births
1971 deaths
Norwegian archaeologists
Directors of museums in Norway
People from Ringsaker
20th-century archaeologists
University of Oslo alumni
Academic staff of the University of Bergen
Recipients of the St. Olav's Medal